The Singapore Youth Olympic Games Organising Committee (SYOGOC) is the organisation in charge of organising the inaugural 2010 Youth Olympic Games. A selection process to determine the members of the games' organising committee commenced soon after the bid result announcement. Plans were made to have the committee visit the IOC, to obtain greater details on organising the event.
The 23 members of the Singapore Youth Olympic Games Organising Committee (SYOGOC) were announced on 24 March 2008 as follows:

The SYOGOC would be aided by a panel of advisors, composed of Cabinet ministers Vivian Balakrishnan, Teo Chee Hean, Tharman Shanmugaratnam and Ng Eng Hen, and former Parliamentary Secretary, Ministry of Community Development, Youth & Sports (MCYS) Teo Ser Luck. In addition, an Inter-Ministry Committee was established with Niam Chiang Meng, former Permanent Secretary, MCYS as its chairman. Comprising five sub-committees on Sports, Culture and Education, Community Outreach, Youth Engagement and Business and Marketing, its members would be announced at a later date.

See also 

 Vancouver Organizing Committee for the 2010 Olympic and Paralympic Winter Games (VANOC)
 Beijing Organizing Committee for the Olympic Games

References

External links 
 
 About SYOGOC – Singapore 2010 official site

2010 Summer Youth Olympics